With Luv' is the first album by the Dutch girl group Luv', released in August 1978 by Phonogram/Philips Records. It includes the hit singles "My Man" (the trio's first record), "U.O.Me" (Luv's breakthrough in Benelux) and the million-seller "You're the Greatest Lover (a #1 song in a large part of Continental Europe). A German pressing of this album includes "Trojan Horse", a successful European chart topper. In 2006, this LP was reissued in digitally remastered form by Universal Music Netherlands as part of the Completely in Luv' box set.

Background
After achieving success on the Dutch and Flemish charts (with the singles "My Man" and "U.O.Me") and on the European hit lists (with the single "You're the Greatest Lover"), Phonogram/Philips Records decided to release Luv's first full-length studio album: ''With Luv.

Production was supervised by Hans van Hemert with the help of Piet Souer. Van Hemert and Souer co-wrote all of the album's tracks under the pseudonym Janschen & Janschens, with the exception of "Don Juanito de Carnaval" (a cover version of Raffaella Carrà's 1977 hit, "A far l'amore comincia tu"). The arrangements of the album were inspired by the musical styles that were popular on the mainstream music market in the late 1970s: the ABBA-esque repertoire (especially with "My Man" and "Dream, Dream"), carnival, Spanish and Latin American music sounds (with "U.O.Me" and "Don Juanito De Carnaval"), disco music (with "Everybody's Shaking Hands On Broadway") and pop music (with compositions like "You're the Greatest Lover" and "Who Do You Wanna Be").

The LP was released at Hilversum Airport on 22 August 1978.

Track listing
All tracks written by Hans van Hemert and Piet Souer under the pseudonym 'Janschen & Janschens' except where noted.Side A:"You're the Greatest Lover" – 2: 50
"Who Do You Wanna Be" – 3:44
"My Man" – 3:05
"Sugar Babe" – 2:49
"Don Juanito de Carnaval" (Daniele Pace, Franco Bracardi, Gianni Boncompagni, Janschen & Janschens) – 3:09
"Life Is on My Side" – 2:38Side B:"U.O.Me (Welcome to Waldolala)" – 2:55
"Dream, Dream" – 3:30
"Oh, Get Ready" – 3:16
"Louis, je t'adore" – 3:40
"Everybody's Shaking Hands on Broadway" – 3:27
"Hang On" – 3:07

Alternative album editions
 Germany - track A5: "Trojan Horse" (Janschen & Janschens) – 3:24

1980 re-issue
Philips Records re-issued the LP in 1980, after the trio had left the label and was under contract with CNR/Carrere Records. This pressing was part of the 'Success series', a re-issue of popular albums from the Philips back catalogue.

2006 reissue bonus tracks
With Luv was remastered and reissued in 2006 as part of the Completely in Luv' box set with the same track listing and three bonus tracks:
 "Don't Let Me Down" (Janschen & Janschens) – 2:37 (B-side of "My Man")
 "Eres mi mejor amante" (Alfred Garrido, Janschen & Janschens) – 2:50 (Spanish version of "You're the Greatest Lover")
 "All You Need Is Luv' Jingle" (Janschen & Janschens) – 0:12

Singles

PersonnelLuv'José Hoebee – vocals
Marga Scheide – vocals
Patty Brard – vocalsAdditional personnel''':
Ernö Olah & Metropole Orkest – strings

Production
Producer: Hans van Hemert
Arranger/conductor: Piet Souer
Mastering: www.pat-sound.nl

Design
Photography: Claude Vanheye
Design: Jan H. van Uden
Art direction: Clouds Studio

Charts
Luv' was a more successful band on the singles charts (at a time when it was significant for the music industry) than on the album charts because the trio's first fans were, in the late 1970s, mainly teenagers (known to be vinyl singles buyers).With Luv went platinum in the Netherlands and silver in Denmark.

References

External links
 Page about With Luv' from the website Fonos.nl about the Dutch Pop Music Archives
 Review of Luv' records (including ''With Luv''') on Bubblegum University website

1978 debut albums
Luv' albums
Philips Records albums
Universal Music Netherlands albums